"Class Reunion (That Used to Be Us)" is a song recorded by American country music band Lonestar. It was released in January 2005 as the third single from their album Let's Be Us Again. Lead singer Richie McDonald co-wrote the song with Frank J. Myers and Don Pfrimmer.

Chart performance
"Class Reunion (That Used to Be Us)" debuted at number 48 on the U.S. Billboard Hot Country Songs chart for the week of January 22, 2005.

References

2005 singles
Lonestar songs
Song recordings produced by Dann Huff
Songs written by Frank J. Myers
Songs written by Richie McDonald
BNA Records singles
Songs written by Don Pfrimmer
2004 songs